Akha is the language spoken by the Akha people of southern China (Yunnan Province), eastern Burma (Shan State), northern Laos, and northern Thailand.

Western scholars group Akha, Hani and Honi into the Hani languages, treating all three as separate mutually unintelligible, but closely related, languages. The Hani languages are, in turn, classified in the Southern Loloish subgroup of Loloish. Loloish and the Mru languages are closely related and are grouped within Tibeto-Burman as the Lolo-Burmese languages.

In accordance with China's official classification of ethnic groups, which groups all speakers of Hani languages into one ethnicity, Chinese linguists consider all Hani languages, including Akha, to be dialects of a single language.

Speakers of Akha live in remote mountainous areas where it has developed into a wide-ranging dialect continuum. Dialects from villages separated by as little as ten kilometers may show marked differences. The isolated nature of Akha communities has also resulted in several villages with divergent dialects. Dialects from extreme ends of the continuum and the more divergent dialects are mutually unintelligible.

Phonology
The Akha language, along with the dialect spoken in Alu village, 55 kilometers northwest of Chiang Rai city in Chiang Rai Province, Thailand is described below. Katsura conducted his study during the late 1960s. With a population of 400 it was, at the time, one of the largest Akha villages in Northern Thailand and was still growing as a result of cross-border migration from Burma. The Akha in Alu spoke no Standard Thai and communicated with outsiders using either Lahu Na or Shan.

Standard Akha has 25 or 26 consonants, and the Alu dialect has 23 or 24 consonants depending on how the syllabic nasal is analyzed. Katsura chose the latter but listed the /m/ component of the syllabic consonant with the vowels.

Any consonant may begin a syllable, but native Akha syllables which don't end in a vowel may only end in either -m or -ɔŋ. A few loan words have been noted that end in -aŋ or -aj. In the case of a nasal coda, some vowels become nasalized. Alu Akha distinguishes ten vowel qualities, contrasting rounded and unrounded back vowels at three heights while only the mid front vowels contrast roundness.

Varieties

Laos
The table below lists the Akha varieties surveyed in Kingsada (1999), Shintani (2001), and Kato (2008), with autonyms and informant birth places given as well. All locations are in Phongsaly Province, northern Laos.

Akha Chicho, spoken in Ban Pasang village, Muang Sing district, Luang Namtha Province, is documented in Hayashi (2018). Hayashi (2018: 8) reports that Akha Chicho is mutually intelligible with Akha Buli.

China
In Jinghong City and Menghai County, the two major Hani subgroups are Jiuwei 鸠为 and Jizuo 吉坐. The Jizuo 吉坐 are the largest Hani ethnic subgroup in Jinghong.

The Jiuwei claim to have migrated from Honghe and Mojiang. The Jiuwei live in various villages in Jinghong, including:
Mengbozhai 勐波寨, Menghan Town 勐罕寨, Jinghong City
Agupu 阿古普 (also called Manwoke 曼窝科) in Leiwu 类吴, Mengsong Township 勐宋, Jinghong City
Napazhai 那帕寨 in Damenglong 大勐笼, Jinghong City
Baiya village 拜牙村 in Menghun 勐混, Menghai County (The Ake 阿克 subgroup lives in Lougu 楼固村, located in Menghun 勐混 as well.)
Babingzhai 坝丙寨, Xidingshan 西定山, Menghai County

There are also ethnic Hani that are locally called Aini 爱尼 living in 7 villages on Nanlin Mountain 南林山 of southwestern Jinghong, namely Manbage 曼八阁, Manjinglong 曼景龙, Manjingnan 曼景囡, Mangudu 曼固独, Manbaqi 曼把奇, Manbasan 曼巴伞, and Manjingmai 曼景卖.

See also
Akha comparative vocabulary list (Wiktionary)

References

Further reading

Word lists for language varieties of Laos
 Kingsadā, Thō̜ngphet, and Tadahiko Shintani. 1999. Basic Vocabularies of the Languages Spoken in Phongxaly, Lao P.D.R. Tokyo: Institute for the Study of Languages and Cultures of Asia and Africa (ILCAA).
 Shintani, Tadahiko, Ryuichi Kosaka, and Takashi Kato. 2001. Linguistic Survey of Phongxaly, Lao P.D.R. Tokyo: Institute for the Study of Languages and Cultures of Asia and Africa (ILCAA).
 Kato, Takashi. 2008. Linguistic Survey of Tibeto-Burman languages in Lao P.D.R. Tokyo: Institute for the Study of Languages and Cultures of Asia and Africa (ILCAA).
Hayashi, Norihiko. 2016. A Phonological Sketch of Akha Buli: A Lolo-Burmese language of Muang Sing, Laos. 神戸市外国語大学外国学研究 [Kobe University of Foreign Studies, Foreign Language Studies] 92: 67-98.
Hayashi, Norihiko. 2018. A Phonological Sketch of Akha Chicho: A Lolo-Burmese language of Luang Namtha, Laos. Proceedings of the 51st International Conference on Sino-Tibetan Languages and Linguistics (2018). Kyoto: Kyoto University.

External links 
 ELAR archive of Archaic Akha language documentation materials

Southern Loloish languages
Languages of China
Languages of Laos
Languages of Myanmar
Languages of Thailand
Languages of Vietnam